Emesa is a small genus of thread-legged bug (Emesinae). Only four species have been described.

Partial species list

Emesa annulata (Dohrn, 1860)
Emesa filum Brullé, 1836
Emesa mantis (Fabricius, 1794)
Emesa mourei Wygodzinsky, 1945
Emesa tenerrima (Dohrn, 1860)

References

Reduviidae
Cimicomorpha genera